"OK Fred" is a song by Jamaican singer-songwriter John Holt. It was first released as a single in 1971.

Background
Errol Dunkley stated that the song is about an up-town girl who falls for a down-town guy who is a non-conformist in the way he dresses and wants to become care-free like him.  Jamaican parents might tell their unkempt children, "Fix up youself, put you shirt in you trousers, you look like a yaga yaga" [sic]. AllMusic gave a different version, saying the song describes the singer's prowess and technique with the opposite sex. The song is considered a cross over hit due to being by a Jamaican artist but appealing to a white audience.

Holt's version features Vin Gordon on trombone. It was produced by Coxsone Dodd. The song was covered with greater chart success by Dunkley.

Chart success
Holt's version did not chart in the UK. Dunkley's version reached No. 11 on the UK Singles Chart in 1979, staying on the chart for 11 weeks.

References 

1971 songs
1971 singles
1979 singles
Jamaican reggae songs
Song recordings produced by Coxsone Dodd
Songs written by John Holt (singer)